Sir Gavin Anthony Lightman (20 December 1939 - 2 March 2020) was a judge of the English High Court of Justice, Chancery Division, since 1994. He retired from office as a High Court judge on 10 January 2008 and was later the chairman of Harbour Litigation Funding's Investment Committee.

He was the son of Harold Lightman and the brother of Stafford Lightman.

Education 
 University College, London (LLB 1st class Hons 1961; Fellow, 2002)
 University of Michigan (LLM)

Career 
 Faculty of Law, University of Sheffield, 1962
 Called to the Bar, Lincoln's Inn, 1963, Bencher 1987; QC 1980
 Judge of the Crown Office 1995- (now Administrative Court)
 Judge of the Restrictive Practices Court 1997-2001

Other positions 
 Vice President, Anglo-Jewish Association, 1995- (Dep. Pres., 1986–92)
 Chairman: Education Committee, Anglo Jewish Association, 1986–94
 Chairman: Education Committee, Hillel House, 1992-96 (Vice-Pres., 1996-)
 Chairman: Legal Friends, University of Haifa, 1990- (Governor, 1994
 Chairman: Leonard Sainer Legal Education Foundation, 2000-
 Patron: Commonwealth Jewish Council, 1994-2000 (Chm., 2000-)
 Patron: Hammerson Home, 1996-
 Patron: British Fulbright Scholars Association (BFSA), 2008-
 Treasurer: Lincoln's Inn, 2008
 Chairman: Investment Committee, Harbour Litigation Funding (2010–present)

Arms

References

 Who's Who (UK)

External links

The British Fulbright Scholars Association

1939 births
2020 deaths
20th-century English judges
Knights Bachelor
English King's Counsel
Members of Lincoln's Inn
20th-century King's Counsel
English Jews
Alumni of University College London
Chancery Division judges
University of Michigan Law School alumni
English people of Lithuanian-Jewish descent
English people of Scottish descent
English people of German-Jewish descent
21st-century English judges